This is the results breakdown of the local elections held in Navarre on 3 April 1979. The following tables show detailed results in the autonomous community's most populous municipalities, sorted alphabetically.

Overall

City control
The following table lists party control in the most populous municipalities, including provincial capitals (shown in bold).

Municipalities

Burlada
Population: 15,609

Estella
Population: 11,935

Pamplona
Population: 173,255

Tafalla
Population: 9,950

Tudela
Population: 24,499

See also
1979 Navarrese foral election

References

Navarre
1979